Meru Malan is a 1985 Gujarati romantic drama film, starring Naresh Kanodia, Snehalata, Firoz Irani, directed by Mehul Kumar. It was the most successful film of the year, and became a super hit in the rural era.The superhit songs are penned by Kanti Ashok and music is composed by Mahesh Naresh duo.

Cast
Naresh Kanodia as Meru
Snehalata as Malan 
Firoz Irani
Hitu Kanodia as a child actor

Soundtrack
The film's songs like Tu Maro Meru Tu Mari Malan, Jaag Re Malan Jaag, Ke Odhni Odhu Odhu Ne Udi Jaye were chartbuster and are evergreen hits till the date. The song Ke Odhni Odhu Odhu, sung by Alka Yagnik and Praful Dave, was a megahit and has been widely cited as one of the popular songs in Gujarati film. It inspired the 2019 Hindi films song Odhani from the movie Made in China.

References

External links
 

1985 films
1980s Gujarati-language films
Indian romantic drama films